Ameles is a wide-ranging genus of praying mantises represented in Africa, Asia, and Europe.

Species

 Ameles aegyptiaca Werner, 1913
 Ameles arabica Uvarov, 1939
 Ameles assoi Bolivar, 1873
 Ameles decolor Charpentier, 1825
 Ameles dumonti Chopard, 1943
 Ameles fasciipennis Kaltenbach, 1963 – spined dwarf mantis
 Ameles gracilis (Brulle, 1838)
 Ameles heldreichi Brunner von Wattenwyl, 1882
 Ameles insularis Agabiti, Salvatrice & Lombardo, 2010
 Ameles kervillei Bolivar, 1911
 Ameles maroccana Uvarov, 1931
 Ameles massai Battiston & Fontana, 2005
 Ameles moralesi Bolivar, 1936
 Ameles paradecolor Agabiti, Salvatrice & Lombardo, 2010
 Ameles persa Bolivar, 1911
 Ameles picteti Saussure, 1869
 Ameles poggii Lombardo, 1986
 Ameles spallanzania Rossi, 1792 – European dwarf mantis
 Ameles syriensis Giglio-Tos, 1915
 Ameles wadisirhani Kaltenbach, 1982

References

External links
 
 

 
Mantodea genera
Mantodea of Africa
Mantodea of Asia
Mantodea of Europe
Amelidae